West Chester station, formerly Market Street Station, is a train station in West Chester, Pennsylvania. Located at Market Street, it currently serves as a stop on the West Chester Railroad heritage railroad. The location was previously used as a stop on the Pennsylvania Railroad's (PRR) West Chester Branch, and later became a part of SEPTA's R3 West Chester Line.

SEPTA discontinued regular passenger service in September 1986, due to deteriorating track conditions, Chester County's desire to expand facilities at Exton station on SEPTA's Paoli/Thorndale Line, and the existence of faster and more frequent bus service on SEPTA Route 104 along West Chester Pike to 69th Street Terminal. Heritage service was restored by the West Chester Railroad  in 1997, a privately owned and operated tourist railroad that operates between Glen Mills and West Chester.

Station history

The West Chester & Philadelphia Railroad opened Market Street station in 1875. It was rebuilt following a major fire in 1885. The main building was razed in 1968.

SEPTA later used the stop for the R3 West Chester Line. In 1986, SEPTA discontinued service due to deteriorating track conditions, the expansion of Exton station, and the improvement of bus service on SEPTA Route 104. The frame building erected in place of the older station was closed and razed.

In 1997, the West Chester Railroad (WCRR) constructed a new station for its heritage line running to Glen Mills. Except for the concrete platform, nothing remains of the former station; however, the foundation outline from the former building is visible. WCRR erected a one-room station on site that serves as a ticket office and gift shop.

Service restoration efforts
In 2014, the Chester County Planning Commission's long-term public transportation plan envisioned the return of SEPTA service to West Chester. In 2018 a Pennsylvania Department of Transportation report estimated rebuilding to cost $380M USD.  In July 2022 the West Chester Borough Council formed a Rail Service Restoration Committee to explore the use of battery-operated rail cars as a lower cost alternative to a full rebuilding of an electrified line.

References

Further reading

External links

Rail Service Restoration Committee | Borough of West Chester, Pennsylvania 

Railway stations closed in 1986
Former SEPTA Regional Rail stations
West Chester University
Former railway stations in Chester County, Pennsylvania
West Chester, Pennsylvania
1986 disestablishments in Pennsylvania
Railway stations in the United States opened in 1875
Railway stations in the United States opened in 1997